This is a list of the National Register of Historic Places listings in Johnson County, Texas.

This is intended to be a complete list of properties and districts listed on the National Register of Historic Places in Johnson County, Texas. There are two districts and six individual properties listed on the National Register in the county. Four individually listed properties are Recorded Texas Historic Landmarks including three of which that are also designated as State Antiquities Landmarks. The district contains an additional Recorded Texas Historic Landmark.

Current listings

The publicly disclosed locations of National Register properties and districts may be seen in a mapping service provided.

|}

See also

National Register of Historic Places listings in Texas
Recorded Texas Historic Landmarks in Johnson County

External links

References

Johnson County, Texas
Johnson County
Buildings and structures in Johnson County, Texas